Keith Jones (23 October 1928 – 25 August 2007) was a Welsh international footballer. A goalkeeper, he made 295 league appearances in a 13-year career in the Football League, and won one cap for Wales in 1949.

He spent May 1946 to July 1957 at Aston Villa, and made 199 appearances in all competitions, though was usually the club's second choice goalkeeper. He was sold on to Port Vale for £3,500, and helped the "Valiants" to win the Fourth Division title in 1958–59. He moved on to Crewe Alexandra in April 1959, before leaving the club the following year.

Club career
Jones played for Stourport Swifts, West Bromwich Albion, and Kidderminster Harriers, before signing with Aston Villa in May 1946. As Joe Rutherford's understudy, he did not feature in 1946–47, but made 19 appearances in 1947–48, as the "Villans" posted a sixth-place finish in the First Division. He played 13 games in 1948–49 and ten games in 1949–50 as Villa finished 10th and 12th in manager Alex Massie's last seasons in charge. Jones remained the club's back-up goalkeeper under new boss George Martin, playing 15, 11 and 20 matches respectively, as Villa finished 15th in 1950–51, sixth in 1951–52, and 11th in 1952–53. New boss Eric Houghton then made Jones the club's regular custodian, as he featured 34, 41 and 35 times respectively as Villa finished 13th in 1953–54, sixth in 1954–55 and 20th in 1955–56. However, he played just the one game in 1956–57 as Villa finished tenth. Nigel Sims was the goalkeeper in the 1957 FA Cup Final victory over Manchester United. In eleven years at Villa Park, Jones played 185 league and 14 FA Cup games.

He was sold to Port Vale in July 1957 for £3,500. He went straight into the first team, ahead of back-up 'keeper John Poole, and made 46 appearances in 1957–58, the last ever season of Third Division South football. However, by December 1958 he had lost his place in the team to Ken Hancock, and was transferred to nearby Crewe Alexandra in April 1959. Norman Low's "Valiants" went on to finish as champions of the newly created Fourth Division in 1958–59. Harry Ware's "Railwaymen" struggled near the football of the Football League in 1958–59 and 1959–60, after which point Jones departed Gresty Road.

International career
Jones received his sole Wales cap on 9 November 1949, in a 2–0 defeat to Scotland at Hampden Park.

Career statistics
Source:

Honours
Port Vale
Football League Fourth Division: 1958–59

References

1928 births
2007 deaths
Welsh footballers
Association football goalkeepers
Stourport Swifts F.C. players
West Bromwich Albion F.C. players
Kidderminster Harriers F.C. players
Aston Villa F.C. players
Port Vale F.C. players
Crewe Alexandra F.C. players
English Football League players
Wales international footballers